Ragnhild Hilt (20 September 1945 – 25 June 2014) was a Norwegian actress.

She was born in Oslo as a daughter of sculptor Odd Hilt. She took her education at the National Academy of Theatre, and spent her entire career at the Det Norske Teatret from 1971 to the spring of 2014.

She made her film debut in 1978's Blood of the Railroad Workers. Her last film was 2013's I Belong, where she was nominated for an Amanda Award. She died in June 2014.

References

1945 births
2014 deaths
Actresses from Oslo
Oslo National Academy of the Arts alumni
Norwegian stage actresses
Norwegian film actresses